The New Westminster Salmonbellies are a Men's Senior 'A' lacrosse team located in New Westminster, BC. Their home arena is Queen's Park Arena. They compete as part of the Western Lacrosse Association and have won the Mann Cup 24 times, most recently in 1991. The 1968–1972 teams were collectively inducted into the Canadian Lacrosse Hall of Fame in 2004.

They won their first Mann Cup in 1915. Prior to 1932, they played as a field lacrosse team but in May 1932 box lacrosse was adopted for the senior league in British Columbia - and the Salmonbellies have been a box lacrosse team since then. The Salmonbellies have won the Mann Cup more than any other lacrosse team. They had won at least one Mann Cup in every decade since the inception of the trophy, before the 2000s.

Salmonbellie Alumni Paul Parnell, Wayne Goss, Eric Cowieson, Jack Bionda, Cliff Sepka, Dave Durante and Geordie Dean have all had their numbers retired by the team. There are more Salmonbellies alumni in the Canadian Lacrosse Hall of Fame than from any other team.

The Salmonbellie name arose from a taunt given by an opposing team's fan during an early game.  The fan called the New West team "salmonbellies" referring to the fact that salmon was considered a lowly food at the time.  But the players liked the name, concluding that the belly was the prime portion on the fish, so the name was adopted and has stuck for over a century.  Curiously, the name is never spelled with a "y" even when one writes about an individual "Salmonbellie."

Salmonbellies vs. the World: The Story of Lacrosse's Most Famous Team & Their Greatest Opponents (Caitlin Press, 2013) by W.B. MacDonald, is an in-depth, illustrated book which shares stories of the players' lives, successes and heartbreaks.

Founding 
The New Westminster lacrosse club was founded on May 12, 1888 but did not play their first home game in the Royal City until June 8, 1889, a 3–1 loss to Vancouver.

It was stated in the May 11, 1888 issue of the New Westminster Daily British Columbian newspaper that "All lacrosse players are requested to meet on the cricket grounds this evening for the purpose of forming a lacrosse club."

On May 14, 1888 the Daily British Columbian informed that "On Saturday evening a meeting of lacrosse players was held and a club formed. Mr. Glover was appointed chairman pro tem and Mr. Lewis permanent secretary and treasurer. A committee was formed to draft rules and by-laws, and perform other duties in connection with the organization of the club. Practises  will be held every Wednesday and Friday evening for the present, and it is to be hoped that every lover of the game will join the club and assist in making it a success in every way. It is the intention to try and arrange a match with Vancouver on July 1st."

Mann Cup wins 

 1915–17
 1920–25
 1927
 1937
 1943
 1958
 1959
 1962
 1965
 1970
 1972
 1974
 1976
 1981
 1986
 1989
 1991

Mann Cup MVPs 
Salmonbellie Winners of the Mann Cup Most Valuable Player's Mike Kelly Memorial Trophy (Major/Senior A):

1943 	Bill Wilkes
1944 	Ike Hildebrand
1958 	Norm McKay
1959 	Jack Bionda (New Westminster O'Keefes)
1962 	Jack Bionda (New Westminster O'Keefes)
1965 	Les Norman
1970 	Paul Parnell
1972 	Paul Parnell
1974 	Ken Winzoski
1976 	Dave Durante
1981 	Wayne Goss
1986 	Geordie Dean
1987 	Eric Cowieson (jointly held with Jim Meredith of the Brooklyn Redmen)
1989 	Ben Hieltjes
1991	Geordie Dean

All-time field lacrosse record

All-time box lacrosse record

References

Notes

External links
Salmonbellies Official Website
Historical Photo of match between New Westminster and Tecumseh, 1919
Salmonbellies Team Photo, 1908
Salmonbellies Team Photo, c.1910
Lacrosse Game in New Westminster, 1900s

Lacrosse teams in Vancouver
Western Lacrosse Association teams
New Westminster
Lacrosse clubs established in 1888
1888 establishments in British Columbia